Schwammerl may refer to:
Schwammerl, a nickname of Franz Schubert
Schwammerl, a novel about Schubert by Rudolf Hans Bartsch

See also
Schwammel (disambiguation)